Badak is a village in Bor district of Niğde Province, Turkey. At  it is situated in the Central Anatolian plains. The population of Badak was 320 as of 2011.

References 

Villages in Bor District, Niğde